Cecilie Woller (born 17 September 1992) is a Danish handball player who currently plays for SV Union Halle-Neustadt.

References

Danish female handball players
1992 births
Living people
Youth Olympic gold medalists for Denmark
Handball players at the 2010 Summer Youth Olympics
Danish expatriate sportspeople in Germany